Athlitikos Omilos Nea Artaki FC is a Greek football club based in Nea Artaki, Euboea, Greece.

Honours

Domestic

 Euboea-Boeotia FCA Champions: 2
 1972–73, 1973–74
 Euboea FCA Champions: 7
 1984–85, 1992–93, 1998–99, 1999–00, 2005–06, 2013–14, 2018–19
 Euboea FCA Cup Winners: 5
 1981–82, 2001–02, 2003–04, 2013–14, 2018–19

References

Euboea
Association football clubs established in 1966
1966 establishments in Greece
Gamma Ethniki clubs